Posanges is a commune in the Côte-d'Or department in eastern France.

Population

Sights and monuments
 The Château de Posanges is a 15th-century castle. It has been classified since 1913 as a monument historique by the French Ministry of Culture.

See also
Communes of the Côte-d'Or department

References

Communes of Côte-d'Or